The year 2004 is the 16th year in the history of Shooto, a mixed martial arts promotion based in Japan. In 2004 Shooto held 17 events beginning with, Shooto 2004: 1/24 in Korakuen Hall.

Title fights

Events list

Shooto 2004: 1/24 in Korakuen Hall

Shooto 2004: 1/24 in Korakuen Hall was an event held on January 24, 2004 at Korakuen Hall in Tokyo, Japan.

Results

Shooto: 3/4 in Kitazawa Town Hall

Shooto: 3/4 in Kitazawa Town Hall was an event held on March 4, 2004 at Kitazawa Town Hall in Setagaya, Tokyo, Japan.

Results

Shooto: 3/22 in Korakuen Hall

Shooto: 3/22 in Korakuen Hall was an event held on March 22, 2004 at Korakuen Hall in Tokyo, Japan.

Results

Shooto: Gig Central 5

Shooto: Gig Central 5 was an event held on March 28, 2004 at Nagoya Civic Assembly Hall in Nagoya, Aichi, Japan.

Results

Shooto 2004: 4/11 in Osaka Prefectural Gymnasium

Shooto 2004: 4/11 in Osaka Prefectural Gymnasium was an event held on April 11, 2004 at Osaka Prefectural Gymnasium in Osaka, Kansai, Japan.

Results

Shooto 2004: 4/16 in Kitazawa Town Hall

Shooto 2004: 4/16 in Kitazawa Town Hall was an event held on April 16, 2004 at Kitazawa Town Hall in Setagaya, Tokyo, Japan.

Results

Shooto 2004: 5/3 in Korakuen Hall

Shooto 2004: 5/3 in Korakuen Hall was an event held on May 3, 2004 at Korakuen Hall in Tokyo, Japan.

Results

Shooto: Shooto Junkie Is Back!

Shooto: Shooto Junkie Is Back! was an event held on June 27, 2004 at Chiba Blue Field in Chiba, Japan.

Results

Shooto 2004: 7/4 in Kitazawa Town Hall

Shooto 2004: 7/4 in Kitazawa Town Hall was an event held on July 4, 2004 at Kitazawa Town Hall in Setagaya, Tokyo, Japan.

Results

Shooto: 7/16 in Korakuen Hall

Shooto: 7/16 in Korakuen Hall was an event held on July 16, 2004 at Korakuen Hall in Tokyo, Japan.

Results

Shooto: Gig Central 6

Shooto: Gig Central 6 was an event held on September 12, 2004 at Nagoya Civic Assembly Hall in Nagoya, Aichi, Japan.

Results

Shooto: 9/26 in Kourakuen Hall

Shooto: 9/26 in Kourakuen Hall was an event held on September 26, 2004 at Korakuen Hall in Tokyo, Japan.

Results

Shooto 2004: 10/17 in Osaka Prefectural Gymnasium

Shooto 2004: 10/17 in Osaka Prefectural Gymnasium was an event held on October 17, 2004 at Osaka Prefectural Gymnasium in Osaka, Kansai, Japan.

Results

Shooto: Wanna Shooto 2004

Shooto: Wanna Shooto 2004 was an event held on November 12, 2004 at Korakuen Hall in Tokyo, Japan.

Results

Shooto: Rookie Tournament 2004 Final

Shooto: Rookie Tournament 2004 Final was an event held on November 25, 2004 at Kitazawa Town Hall in Setagaya, Tokyo, Japan.

Results

G-Shooto: G-Shooto 01

G-Shooto: G-Shooto 01 was an event held on November 26, 2004 at Zepp Tokyo in Tokyo, Japan.

Results

Shooto: Year End Show 2004

Shooto: Year End Show 2004 was an event held on December 14, 2004 at Yoyogi National Gymnasium in Tokyo, Japan.

Results

See also 
 Shooto
 List of Shooto champions
 List of Shooto Events

References

Shooto events
2004 in mixed martial arts